12999 Toruń, provisional designation , is a carbonaceous Baptistina asteroid from the inner regions of the asteroid belt, approximately 8 kilometers in diameter. It was discovered on 30 August 1981, by British–American astronomer Edward Bowell at Lowell Observatory's Anderson Mesa Station in Flagstaff, Arizona, and named after the Polish city of Toruń.

Orbit and classification 

Toruń is a carbonaceous C-type asteroid and a member of the small Baptistina family. It orbits the Sun in the inner main-belt at a distance of 1.8–2.7 AU once every 3 years and 5 months (1,252 days). Its orbit has an eccentricity of 0.19 and an inclination of 6° with respect to the ecliptic. The first precovery was taken at Goethe Link Observatory in 1957, extending the asteroid's observation arc by 24 years prior to its discovery.

Physical characteristics

Rotation period 

A rotational lightcurve of Toruń was obtained from photometric observations at the U.S. Palomar Transient Factory in December 2009. The provisional lightcurve gave a rotation period of  hours with a brightness amplitude of 0.09 in magnitude.

Diameter and albedo 

According to the survey carried out by the NEOWISE mission of NASA's Wide-field Infrared Survey Explorer, Toruń measures 3.5 kilometers in diameter and its surface has a very high albedo of 0.39. The Collaborative Asteroid Lightcurve Link (CALL) disagrees with the findings by the space-based mission and assumes a standard albedo for carbonaceous asteroids of 0.057, with a correspondingly larger diameter of 8.0 kilometers with an absolute magnitude of 14.22. As with 1696 Nurmela, another member of the Baptistina family, CALL assumes this asteroid's composition (also see carbonaceous chondrites) to differ significantly from the much brighter asteroid 298 Baptistina, which is considered to be an interloper in its own family.

Naming 

In 2008, this minor planet was named after the city of Toruń, Poland. It is the birthplace of Nicolaus Copernicus, significant to Polish and European history, a UNESCO World Heritage listed Old Town, and the main site of the Nicolaus Copernicus University, where its observatory at Piwnice, the largest in Poland, is located. The naming followed a suggestion by Polish astronomer T. Michałowski. The approved naming citation was published by the Minor Planet Center 21 March 2008.

References

External links 
 Baptistina Asteroid Family and K/T Mass Extinction, Vishnu Reddy, 2013
 Asteroid Lightcurve Database (LCDB), query form (info )
 Dictionary of Minor Planet Names, Google books
 Asteroids and comets rotation curves, CdR – Observatoire de Genève, Raoul Behrend
 Discovery Circumstances: Numbered Minor Planets (10001)-(15000) – Minor Planet Center
 
 

012999
Discoveries by Edward L. G. Bowell
Named minor planets
19810830